The two German DRG Class 61 steam engines were express train locomotives specifically built by Henschel for the Henschel-Wegmann train in service with the Deutsche Reichsbahn. The Henschel-Wegmann train was an initiative of the German locomotive construction industry, intended to be able to demonstrate a powerful steam locomotive-hauled train alongside the emerging express diesel multiple units, such as the Hamburg Flyer.

Construction 

Because it was planned to run the train in shuttle services to a tight time schedule, it was necessary that the engine could run at top speed in both directions. This resulted in a tank locomotive rather than the tender locomotive design otherwise used for long-distance high-speed links. In order to be able to attain the high running performance aimed at, locomotive and coaches were designed to be especially light, albeit the coal and water supplies had still to be sufficient for a one-way trip on the planned route.

In building them, component designs from the Deutsche Reichsbahn's standard steam locomotives (Einheitsdampflokomotiven) were used as far as possible, but in quite a number of areas other components were used. Both locomotives were fitted with a streamlined shell. The water tank tapered at the front and gave the engine driver and stoker a good all-round view of the line. The "cover plates" covered the drive completely.

In contrast to the first engine, 61 002, which was built later, had a drive with three cylinders and larger supply tanks. To support the latter, the rear carrying bogie was extended to three axles. As a result of the more powerful drive, the punctuality of the train was improved - it had been unsatisfactory with 61 001. In addition the second locomotive had smoke deflectors on top next to the smoke exhaust, which were not fitted to 61 001.

Operation 
With its  diameter driving wheels, the locomotive itself achieved the planned speed of 175 km/h without any difficulty, but when hauling its streamlined train it could only reach 160. However it was pushed to complete the  short turnaround allowed in Dresden because the locomotive not only had to run around, but also replenish its supplies.

When 61 001 was not available or when either scheduled or unscheduled work was being carried out on her, a DRG Class 01 or DRG Class 03 headed the train. However, with top speeds of only , they could not come close to 61 001's record.

Not long after construction work had begun on 61 001, its variant 61 002 was planned and built at the start of 1939. In May that year, the first factory trial runs were carried out and the locomotive was transferred on 12 June 1939 to the locomotive depot (Bahnbetriebswerk or Bw) at Grunewald. It was likely taken into service at the beginning of 1939/40, so it almost certainly would not have been hauling the streamlined train in regular passenger service due to the outbreak of the war and the Henschel-Wegmann train being reserved for Wehrmacht purposes.

After the cessation of the train's operations at the start of 1939, 61 001 was used for heating duties at Bw Berlin-Grunewald. From December 1940, it found itself once again in Dresden-Altstadt on express train services and was given conventional train and buffer equipment in November 1942. Its operations log shows that it was only sparingly used. From 1943 to the war's end, the Reichsbahn repair shop (Reichsbahnsausbesserungswerk or RAW) at Braunschweig was responsible for the engine. Between July 1945 and March 1946, it travelled about  hauling passenger trains.

Survival post-1945 
Locomotive 61 001 found itself in the  British Zone at the end of the war and was allocated to Bw Hannover, but seldom used. In 1947 it had a general inspection and on 23 October 1948 it was stationed in Bebra, where it was in regular service until May 1949. On 2 November 1951 the engine suffered serious damage following an accident in Münster, whereupon it was retired on 14 November 1952 and scrapped in 1957.

Locomotive 61 002 remained in Dresden and was employed in passenger train service there. As a one-off it was however always a problem to use it for regular operations. It was converted in 1961 by the DR in East Germany in RAW Meiningen to a fast experimental locomotive with a tender and reclassified as 18 201. In 2002, number 18 201 was totally overhauled in the Meiningen steam engine shop and is now in the possession of the Steam Plus company (Dampf-Plus GmbH) owned by Christian Goldschagg and Axel Zwingenberger.

See also
 Deutsche Reichsbahn-Gesellschaft
 List of DRG locomotives and railbuses
 Grunewald Locomotive Research Office
 MÁV Class 242, a Hungarian streamlined 4-4-4T of similar age and purpose

Literature 
 
 
 
 

61
4-6-4T locomotives
4-6-6T locomotives
Streamlined steam locomotives
61
Henschel locomotives
Railway locomotives introduced in 1935
Standard gauge locomotives of Germany
Articles containing video clips
2′C2′ h2t locomotives
2′C3′ h3t locomotives
Passenger locomotives